Olivera "Olja" Ćirković (born 3 September 1969), née Olivera Vasić, is a Serbian writer and painter, former convicted criminal and former professional basketball player and administrator. She was a member of international jewel thief network Pink Panthers.

Basketball career

Playing career 
Ćirković spent her career with Voždovac, Crvena zvezda, Jedinstvo Tuzla (Bosnia and Herzegovina), Pagrati Athens (Greece) and Celje (Slovenia).

National team career 
Ćirković was a member of the Yugoslavia women's national under-18 basketball team that won the bronze medal at the 1988 European Championship for Junior Woman together with Nina Bjedov, Danira Nakić, Eleonora Wild, Danijela Ilić and others. Over two tournament games, she averaged 1.5 points per game.

Post-playing career 
After retirement from playing career, Ćirković worked as a sports director for Crvena zvezda.

Criminal career 
Ćirković is the infamous female member of the international jewel thief network Pink Panthers. She was the mastermind behind a team of criminals raiding jewellery stores in Greece. She was convicted and arrested twice for her personal involvement in those crimes. The first arrest was in 2006.
In March 2012 she got caught again and was arrested a second time. On 12 July 2012, she managed to successfully escape from the central prison of Athens. She escaped on foot to her native country Serbia before gathering her criminal team again to plan & execute the next robbery - again in Athens on 26 November 2012. On 29 November 2012, she was arrested and convicted to a total of 32 years of prison in Corydallos penitentiary. In a later trial, her lawyer managed to convince the court to dismiss some of the charges and due to a general amnesty in 2017, she finally spent only 5 years in prison.

Personal life 
Ćirković has one son who also plays basketball.

Works 
 
 
 Ćirković, Olivera (2019). Ja, Pink Panter 2 – Arhondisa

References

External links 
 

1969 births
Living people
Basketball players from Belgrade
Centers (basketball)
Jewel thieves
People convicted of robbery
Power forwards (basketball)
Serbian basketball executives and administrators
Serbian criminals
Serbian female criminals
Serbian women's basketball players
Serbian women in business
Serbian women writers
Serbian expatriate basketball people in Bosnia and Herzegovina
Serbian expatriate basketball people in Greece
Serbian expatriate basketball people in Slovenia
Yugoslav women's basketball players
ŽKK Crvena zvezda players
ŽKK Voždovac players